The 1999–2000 Indiana Hoosiers men's basketball team represented Indiana University. Their head coach was Bobby Knight, and it would ultimately be his last full season coaching the Hoosiers. The team played its home games in  Assembly Hall in Bloomington, Indiana, and was a member of the Big Ten Conference.

The Hoosiers finished the regular season with an overall record of 20–9 and a conference record of 10–6, finishing 4th in the Big Ten Conference. After losing to the Fighting Illini in the quarterfinals of the Big Ten tournament, the Hoosiers were invited to dance in the 2000 NCAA tournament. IU lost in the first round to Pepperdine.

Roster

Schedule/Results

|-
!colspan=8| Regular Season
|-

|-
!colspan=8| Big Ten tournament

|-
!colspan=8| NCAA tournament

References

Indiana Hoosiers men's basketball seasons
Indiana
Indiana
1999 in sports in Indiana
2000 in sports in Indiana